Suzheny moy... is a second solo studio album by Russian singer Irina Allegrova released in 2003 by Russkoye snabzheniye.

Overview
In fact, the album is a reissue of the singer's debut album Strannik moy with the addition of new songs. The author of most of the songs on the album is Igor Nikolayev. The album also features songs by Viktor Chaika — "Babnik" and "Tranzit". The song "Igrushka" was performed by Allegrova back in the days when she was part of the band Elektroklub.

The album was released in 1994 through the label Russkoye snabzheniye (RS-94015) on compact discs. In the same year, the next studio album was released, and soon a collection of the best songs was released with the title Suzheny moy... through Soyuz Studio. Most of the songs on the album became big hits and were included in the "golden fund" of Irina Allegrova's songs.

In 2021, the album was re-released by the Warner Music Russia label in digital format, the track list of the album was not changed, but remakes took the place of the original versions of some songs.

Critical reception

Alexey Mazhayev from InterMedia called the album a "hit" and "moderately heartbreaking", and the songs are "very interesting examples from the point of view of studying the psychology of lyrical heroines".

Track listing

Release history

References

1994 albums
Irina Allegrova albums
Russian-language albums